The Governor Island, part of the Schouten Island Group, comprise two small granite islands with a combined area of about  that lie close to the eastern coast of Tasmania, in south-eastern Australia. The island is located near the Freycinet Peninsula and the town of Bicheno and is a nature reserve.

Fauna
Recorded breeding seabird and wader species are little penguin, silver gull, sooty oystercatcher and crested tern.

See also

 List of islands of Tasmania

References

Schouten Island Group
South East coast of Tasmania
Protected areas of Tasmania